Charles Oliver Murray (1842 – 11 December 1923) was a Scottish artist and printmaker.

Born in the village of Denholm in Roxburghshire in 1842, Murray trained at the Trustees' Academy in Edinburgh and moved to London by 1872. He was elected a Fellow of the Society of Painter-Etchers on 7 May 1881. He had his work published widely in both The Portfolio and The Art Journal from the 1870s onwards, and frequently exhibited at the Royal Academy from 1872 onwards.

Murray died in London on 11 December 1923.

Works

References

External links

Sanders of Oxford

1842 births
1923 deaths
Alumni of the Edinburgh College of Art
19th-century Scottish painters
Scottish male painters
20th-century Scottish painters
Scottish engravers
20th-century British printmakers
19th-century Scottish male artists
20th-century Scottish male artists
20th-century engravers